Pat Shannahan (died 2020) was a sample clearance expert. Shannahan worked with artists such as the Beastie Boys, Janet Jackson, and The Avalanches to research and clear many of the samples used in their music.

Career 
Shannahan worked for over 20 years clearing the use of samples for musical artists. Over the course of her career Shannahan worked for RCA, ABC Music, Island Records, and Polygram recording companies. She researched which publishing company or independent artist controls the rights to the music to broker a deal to include the sample in another artists work. One of the earliest albums she worked on was an unnamed Prince Paul release.

The Avalanches album Wildflower contained many samples, all of which were cleared by Shannahan. One of the most difficult songs to clear was "Noisy Eater", as it contained samples of the Beatles song "Come Together".

Personal life 
Shannahan lived in Los Angeles, California.

Discography

References 

Sampling (music)
Music licensing organizations
Beastie Boys